Baba Gar Gar or Baba Gargar or Baba Gorgor may refer to:
 Baba Gorgor, Kurdistan